Searsia thyrsiflora is a species of plant in the family Anacardiaceae. It is endemic to Yemen.  Its natural habitat is subtropical or tropical dry forests.

References

Endemic flora of Socotra
thyrsiflora
Least concern plants
Taxonomy articles created by Polbot